Conrad Bolston (born January 9, 1985 in Washington, DC) is a former American football defensive tackle. He was originally signed by the Minnesota Vikings as an undrafted free agent in 2007. He played college football at The University of Maryland.

College career

Bolston played college football at The University of Maryland.

Professional career

Minnesota Vikings

Bolston was signed as an undrafted free agent by the Minnesota Vikings in 2007. He spent the first 12 weeks of the 2007 season on the Vikings' practice squad. On November 28, 2007, he was signed the Vikings active roster and played in one game in which he had one tackle.

Green Bay Packers

On  December 12, 2007 Bolston was signed off waivers from the Minnesota Vikings. Bolston remained on the Packers active roster for the remainder of the regular season and post season but only saw action in the last game of the regular season against the Detroit Lions.  Bolston was cut from the Packers on August 31, 2008 when the team reduced their roster to 53 men and is currently a free agent.

Personal
In September 2008, Bolston was diagnosed with spinal ependymoma. During rehabilitation, he retired from professional football and decided to attend law school.  Bolston is now an assistant coach at St. John's College High School. In 2013, he graduated from Georgetown University Law Center and has entered practice at the international law firm Vinson & Elkins LLP.

References

External links
Maryland Terrapins bio
Minnesota Vikings bio
Green Bay Packers bio

1985 births
Living people
American football defensive tackles
Maryland Terrapins football players
Minnesota Vikings players
Green Bay Packers players
Players of American football from Washington, D.C.